This list contains the main roads throughout the city of Gatineau.

Autoroutes
 Autoroute 5 (Autoroute de la Gatineau)
 Autoroute 50 (Autoroute de l'Outaouais / Autoroute Maurice-Richard)

Avenues
Avenue de Buckingham
Avenue Gatineau

Boulevards

 Boulevard Alexandre-Taché
 Boulevard de la Carrière
 Boulevard de la Cite
 Boulevard de la Cité-des-Jeunes
 Boulevard de la Gappe
 Boulevard de l'Hopital
 Boulevard de l'Outaouais (renamed Boulevard des Allumettières)
 Boulevard de Lucerne 
 Boulevard des Allumettières (Route 148) (merger of Boulevard Saint-Laurent, Boulevard de l'Outaouais and Chemin McConnell)
 Boulevard des Grives
 Boulevard des Hautes-Plaines
 Boulevard des Trembles
 Boulevard du Casino
 Boulevard du Mont-Bleu 
 Boulevard du Plateau
 Boulevard Fournier
 Boulevard Gréber
 Boulevard Labrosse 
 Boulevard La Vérendrye 
 Boulevard Lionel-Emond
 Boulevard Lorrain (Route 366)
 Boulevard Maisonneuve
 Boulevard Maloney (Route 148)
 Boulevard Montclair 
 Boulevard Riel
 Boulevard Sacré-Coeur
 Boulevard Saint-Joseph (Route 105)
 Boulevard Saint-Laurent (renamed Boulevard des Allumettières)
 Boulevard Saint-Raymond (Route 148)
 Boulevard Saint-René
 Boulevard Wilfrid-Lavigne

Chemins (Roads)
Chemin d'Aylmer
Chemin de Masson 
Chemin de Montréal
Chemin de la Savane
Chemin des Erables
Chemin des Terres
Chemin Cook
Chemin Eardley 
Chemin Freeman
Chemin McConnell (portions were merged into Boulevard de l'Outaouais, now called Boulevard des Allumettières)
Chemin Klock
Chemin Perry
Chemin Pink
Chemin Tache
Chemin Vanier

Promenades (Parkways)
Promenade de la Gatineau
Promenade du Lac-des-Fées

Rues (Streets) 
Rue du Centre
Rue Davidson 
Rue Front
Rue Gamelin 
Rue Georges
Rue Goulet
Rue Jacques-Cartier
Rue Jean-Proulx
Rue Laurier
Rue MacLaren
Rue Main
Rue Montcalm
Rue Notre-Dame 
Rue Principale
Rue Roméo-Gendron
Rue Saint-Louis (Route 307)

Auto bridges
 Alexandra Bridge
 Alonzo Wright Bridge
 Champlain Bridge
 Chaudière Bridge
 Des Draveurs Bridge
 Lady Aberdeen Bridge
 Macdonald-Cartier Bridge
 Portage Bridge

Other arteries
 Montée Paiement
 Place Samuel-de-Champlain 
 Prince of Wales Bridge

Gatineau